The wrestling events at the 2019 European Games were held at the Minsk Sports Palace with a capacity 3,300 seats from 25 to 30 June. 18 events were held, six events in freestyle for men, six events for women, and six in the Greco-Roman style for men.

Participating nations

Medal summary

Medal table

Men's freestyle

Men's Greco-Roman

 Kiryl Hryshchanka from Belarus originally won the gold medal, but was later disqualified for doping violations.

Women's freestyle

References

External links
Final Classification by Event
Results book

 
Sports at the 2019 European Games
2019
European Games